Francisco Antonio de Basavilbaso (1732 – c. 1800) was a Spanish jurist and politician, who held various government posts during the Viceroyalty of Peru, including as alcalde, escribano, regidor, and emissary of Buenos Aires in Spain.

Biography 
He was born in Buenos Aires, the son of Domingo de Basavilbaso and María Ignacia de Urtubia, belonging to a noble family of the city. He completed his elementary education in the city and traveled to Europe to study at the University of Seville, where he obtained his law degree in 1759. He was married in Buenos Aires to María Aurelia Ross, daughter of Guillermo Ross and María Antonia del Pozo Silva, belonging to a distinguished family of Scottish and Creole origin . 

He held various political positions in Buenos Aires including as regidor and alcalde of first vote in 1774, being appointed to the office of attorney general of the city in 1775. His works as procurador general of Buenos Aires, included various works concerning the establishment of public schools in the parishes of the city. He was also involved in educational reforms at the University of Córdoba, aimed at avoiding the long trips that law students had to make to the universities of Chuquisaca and Santiago. 

He also had a distinguished job as Escribano Mayor of Government of the Río de la Plata, serving between 1784 and 1795. He was succeeded by his son José Ramón Basavilbaso, who also served as a government notary during the post colonial period. During his residence in Spain he had served like intermediary between the Spanish Court and his father, who held the position of administrator general of the Correo of the Río de la Plata.

References 

1732 births
1800s deaths
People from Buenos Aires
Spanish nobility
18th-century Spanish military personnel
Spanish colonial governors and administrators
Spanish noble families
18th-century  Spanish businesspeople
Mayors of Buenos Aires
Río de la Plata